Stenidea alutacea is a species of beetle in the family Cerambycidae. It was described by Thomson in 1860, originally under the genus Amblesthis. It is known from South Africa, Mozambique, and Zimbabwe.

References

alutacea
Beetles described in 1860